Unbreakable is a 2000 American psychological superhero thriller film directed, written, and co-produced by M. Night Shyamalan and starring Bruce Willis and Samuel L. Jackson with Robin Wright, Spencer Treat Clark, and Charlayne Woodard. It is the first installment in the Unbreakable film series. In Unbreakable, David Dunn (Willis) survives a train crash with no injuries, leading to the realization that he harbors superhuman abilities. As he begins to grapple with this discovery, he comes to the attention of disabled comic book store owner Elijah Price (Jackson), who manipulates David to understand him.

Shyamalan organized the narrative of Unbreakable to parallel a comic book's traditional three-part story structure. After settling on the origin story, Shyamalan wrote the screenplay as a speculative screenplay with Willis already set to star in the film and Jackson in mind to portray Elijah Price. Filming began in April 2000 and was completed in July.

Unbreakable was released on November 21, 2000. It received generally positive reviews, praise for Shyamalan's direction, screenplay, its aesthetics, the performances, the emotional weight of the story, cinematography, and the score by James Newton Howard. The film has subsequently gained a strong cult following. A realistic vision of the superhero genre, it is regarded by many as one of Shyamalan's best films and one of the best superhero films. In 2011, Time listed it as one of the top ten superhero films of all time, ranking it number four. Quentin Tarantino also included it on his list of the top 20 films released since 1992.

After years of development on a follow-up film, a thematic sequel, Split, with Willis reprising his role as David Dunn in a cameo role, was released in January 2017. After the financial and critical success of Split, Shyamalan immediately began working on a third film, titled Glass, which was released January 18, 2019, thus making Unbreakable the first installment in the Unbreakable film series.

Plot 
Former star quarterback David Dunn is the sole survivor of a train crash that leaves him completely unharmed. After a memorial service for the victims, David finds a note on his car asking how long it's been since he has been ill and inviting him to "Limited Edition", an art gallery operated by comic book expert, Elijah Price. He goes with his son Joseph to meet Elijah, who suffers from brittle bone disease. Elijah explains his theory of real-life superheroes, and that there must be someone "unbreakable" at the opposite extreme. David is unsettled and leaves but later finds he can bench press , well above his expectations. Joseph idolizes his father, believing him to be a superhero, although David maintains that he is an ordinary man.

David challenges Elijah's theory with an incident from his childhood when he almost drowned and contracted pneumonia. Elijah suggests that highlights the common convention whereby superheroes have a weakness, contending that David's is water. David recalls the car accident in which he had been unharmed and ripped off the car door with his bare hands to rescue his girlfriend, Audrey. He feigned injury from the crash to quit football because Audrey disliked the violence of the sport.

Under Elijah's influence, David realizes that his intuition for picking out dangerous people in his work as a security guard is actually extrasensory perception. Consciously honing this ability, David discovers that touch contact with people brings him visions of criminal acts they have committed. As people bump into him in a crowd, he senses the crimes they have perpetrated such as theft, assault, and rape. He finds one to act on: a sadistic janitor who has invaded a family home, killed the father, and is now holding the mother and two children captive. David follows the janitor to the victims' house and frees the children. The janitor pushes him into a swimming pool where he nearly drowns as he cannot swim, but is rescued by the children. David strangles the janitor to death, but finds the janitor has killed the mother. The next morning, David shows Joseph a newspaper article featuring a sketch of the anonymous hero, whom Joseph recognizes as his father and tearfully promises to keep his secret.

David meets Elijah's elderly mother, who explains the difference between villains who fight heroes with physical strength and those who use their intelligence. Elijah asks David to shake his hand, which reveals that Elijah was responsible for numerous high-profile "accidents,” including David's train crash, to find his superhero rival. Elijah tells David, "Now that we know who you are, I know who I am". He adopts his childhood nickname, "Mr. Glass," as his supervillain moniker. David reports Elijah's crimes to the police, and Elijah is confined to a psychiatric hospital for the criminally insane.

Cast 
 Bruce Willis as David Dunn, a former football player with superhuman strength who sees the crimes of those whom he touches 
 Davis Duffield as 20-year-old David
 Samuel L. Jackson as Elijah Price/Mr. Glass, a comic book theorist, and deranged terrorist with brittle bone disease
 Johnny Hiram Jamison as 13-year-old Elijah
 Robin Wright as Audrey Dunn, David's wife and a physical therapist 
 Laura Regan as 20-year-old Audrey
 Spencer Treat Clark as Joseph Dunn, David's son who believes his father is a superhero 
 Charlayne Woodard as Mrs. Price, Elijah's mother
 Eamonn Walker as Dr. Mathison
 Leslie Stefanson as Kelly
 Michaelia Carroll as Babysitter
 Whitney Sugarman as Physical Therapist
 Bostin Christopher as Comic Book Clerk
 Elizabeth Lawrence as School Nurse
 Chance Kelly as Orange Suit Man
 Michael Kelly as Dr. Dubin
 Joey Hazinsky as Five-Year-Old Boy
 Dianne Cotten Murphy as Woman Walking By

Writer, director, and producer M. Night Shyamalan makes an appearance as Stadium Drug Dealer. He reprises this role in the 2016 and 2019 films Split, and Glass, which both credit him as surveillance security guard Jai who in Glass jokingly says he used to do shady stuff in the stadium back in his youth.

In October 2018, Shyamalan confirmed a fan theory that "Five-Year-Old Boy" and "Woman Walking By", who bump into David Dunn outside a stadium, are younger versions of Kevin Wendell Crumb and Penelope Crumb from Split, confirmed in the 2019 film Glass.

Production 
When M. Night Shyamalan conceived the idea for Unbreakable, the outline had a comic book's traditional three-part structure (the superhero's "birth", his struggles against general evil-doers, and the hero's ultimate battle against the "archenemy"). Finding the birth section most interesting, he decided to write Unbreakable as an origin story. During the filming of The Sixth Sense, Shyamalan had already approached Bruce Willis for the lead role of David Dunn. With Willis and Samuel L. Jackson specifically in mind for the two leading characters, Shyamalan began to write Unbreakable as a spec script during post-production on The Sixth Sense. Jackson recalled meeting Willis in a casino in Casablanca while he was on vacation prior to Unbreakables production; Willis told Jackson that he had just finished filming for Shyamalan's The Sixth Sense and told Jackson about the new script that was written for both of them.

With the financial and critical success of The Sixth Sense in August 1999, Shyamalan gave Walt Disney Studios a first-look deal for Unbreakable. In return, Disney purchased Shyamalan's screenplay at a "spec script record" for $5 million. He was also given another $5 million to direct. Disney decided to release Unbreakable under their Touchstone Pictures banner. It also helped Shyamalan establish his own production company, Blinding Edge Pictures. Julianne Moore  was cast as Audrey, David's wife, in January 2000, but dropped out in March 2000, to take on the role of Clarice Starling in Hannibal. Robin Wright Penn was cast in her place. Principal photography began on April 25, 2000 and ended that July. The majority of filming took place in Philadelphia, Pennsylvania, the film's setting.

Shyamalan and cinematographer Eduardo Serra chose several camera angles to simulate the look of a comic book panel. Various visual narrative motifs were also applied. Several scenes relating to the Mr. Glass character involve glass. As a newborn, he is primarily seen reflected in mirrors, and as a young child, he is seen reflected in a blank TV screen. When he leaves his calling card on the windshield of David Dunn's car, he is reflected in a glass frame in his art gallery. Jackson requested his walking stick be made of glass to make his character more menacing. Using purple as Mr. Glass' color to David Dunn's green was also Jackson's idea. Mr. Glass' wig was modeled after Afro-American statesman Frederick Douglass. As he does in his other films, Shyamalan makes a cameo appearance; he plays a man David suspects of dealing drugs inside the stadium.

Shyamalan said that he wanted to market Unbreakable as a comic book movie, but Disney—which had not yet bought Marvel Comics—preferred to advertise it as a supernatural thriller like The Sixth Sense. More than 15 minutes of footage was deleted during post-production of Unbreakable. These scenes are available on the DVD release.

Willis and Jackson had previously worked together on Die Hard with a Vengeance, Pulp Fiction, and Loaded Weapon 1.

Soundtrack 
James Newton Howard was approached by Shyamalan to work on Unbreakable immediately after scoring The Sixth Sense. "He sat there and storyboarded the whole movie for me", Howard said. "I've never had a director do that for me." Shyamalan wanted a "singularity" tone for the music. "He wanted something that was very different, very distinctive, that immediately evoked the movie when people heard it," Howard explained. Howard and Shyamalan chose to simplify the score, and minimized the number of instruments (strings, trumpets and piano), with limited orchestrations. It was recorded at AIR Studios Lyndhurst Hall, a converted church in London. "You could have recorded the same music in a studio in Los Angeles, and it would have been great, but there is something about the sound of that church studio," Howard remarked. "It's definitely more misterioso."

Comic book references 

Filmmaker and comic book writer Kevin Smith felt Unbreakable was briefly similar to a comic book titled Mage: The Hero Discovered, written and illustrated by Matt Wagner.

As in comic books, the main characters have their identified color schemes and aliases. David's are green and "Security" or "Hero", while Elijah's are purple and "Mr. Glass". The colors show up in their clothes, the wallpaper and bed sheets in their houses, Elijah's note to David, and various personal items. The people whose bad deeds are sensed by David are identified by an article of clothing in a single bright color (red, orange), to contrast them with the dark and dreary color scheme typical of the rest of the movie (but not of most comic books). Several scenes also depict characters through reflections or doorways, as if framing them in a picture similar to comic books.

Reception

Box office 
Unbreakable was released in the United States on November 21, 2000, in 2,708 theaters and grossed $30.3 million in its opening weekend, finishing second at the box office behind How the Grinch Stole Christmas. The film ended up earning $95 million domestically and $153.1 million internationally for a total of $248.1 million, against its $75 million production budget.

Critical response  
Unbreakable received generally positive reviews from critics. The website's critical consensus states, "With a weaker ending, Unbreakable is not as good as The Sixth Sense. However, it is a quietly suspenseful film that intrigues and engages, taking the audience through unpredictable twists and turns along the way." On Metacritic the film has a score of 62 out of 100, based on 31 critics, indicating "generally favorable reviews". Audiences polled by CinemaScore gave the film an average grade of "C" on an A+ to F scale.

Roger Ebert of Chicago Sun-Times, gave Unbreakable 3 out of 4 stars and had largely enjoyed the film, but was disappointed with the ending. Ebert believed that Willis' "subtle acting" was positively different from the actor's usual work in "brainless action movies". Richard Corliss of Time opined that Unbreakable continued Shyamalan's previous approach of "balancing sophistication and horror in all of his movies". Desson Thomson from The Washington Post wrote that "just as he did in The Sixth Sense, writer-director M. Night Shyamalan leads you into a fascinating labyrinth, an alternative universe that lurks right under our noses. In this case, it's the mythological world and, in these modern times, the secret design to that labyrinth, the key to the path, is contained in comic books."

Kenneth Turan, writing for the Los Angeles Times, gave a negative review, arguing that Unbreakable had no originality. "Whether it means to or not, the shadow of The Sixth Sense hangs over Unbreakable," Turan reasoned. "If The Sixth Sense hadn't been as big a success as it was, this story might have been assigned to oblivion, or at least to rewrite." Todd McCarthy of Variety mostly criticized Shyamalan's writing and the performances given by the actors. He did praise Dylan Tichenor's editing and James Newton Howard's music composition.

In 2002 Audrey Colombe described the movie's plot as an example of what "Toni Morrison calls a “dehistoricizing allegory,”' with the Elijah Price character as yet another example of White Hollywood's "magical African American male character" helping the white hero do the right thing, though Elijah is described as a rare exception to the rule that this character is "never 'bad'".

Shyamalan admitted he was disappointed by the reaction Unbreakable received from the public and critics. Shyamalan also disliked Touchstone Pictures' marketing campaign. He wanted to promote Unbreakable as a comic book movie, but Touchstone insisted on portraying it as a psychological thriller, similar to The Sixth Sense.

Later reviews 
In 2009, filmmaker Quentin Tarantino praised Unbreakable, and included it on his list of the top 20 films released since 1992, the year he became a director. Tarantino praised the film as a "brilliant retelling of the Superman mythology", and said it contains what he considers to be Bruce Willis' best performance. He also criticized the way the film was marketed upon release, stating he felt that it would have been far more effective if the film's advertising simply posed the question of "what if Superman was here on earth, and didn't know he was Superman?"

In 2011, Time ranked the film at No. 4 in its list of top ten superhero movies of all time, describing it as one of the best superhero origin stories and as a "relatively quiet, subtle and realistic look at the pressures that come with being a superhero." In 2018, The Hollywood Reporter called it a "deconstruction of the American superhero/villain complex" that is "more prescient than ever."

Home media 
The film released on DVD and VHS in 2001. The DVD sold 2.3 million units in the United States, and was the top DVD video rental of 2001. The film thus had a combined global box office and U.S. home video revenue of $371,028,653, with a 495% return on investment. 

In 2008, the movie was released on Blu-ray which had all the bonus features of the Special Edition on DVD "Vista Series".

In the United Kingdom, the film was watched by  viewers on television in 2004, making it the year's third most-watched film on television.

Walt Disney Studios Home Entertainment released the film on Ultra HD Blu-ray on September 21, 2021.

Accolades

Sequels 

After the film's release, rumors of possible sequels began circulating in different interviews and in film fansites. In 2000, Bruce Willis was quoted as hoping for an Unbreakable trilogy. In December 2000, Shyamalan denied rumors he wrote Unbreakable as the first installment of a trilogy, saying he was not even thinking about it. In August 2001, Shyamalan stated that, because of successful DVD sales, he had approached Touchstone Pictures about an Unbreakable sequel, an idea Shyamalan said the studio originally turned down because of the film's disappointing box office performance. In a September 2008 article, Shyamalan and Samuel L. Jackson said there was some discussion of a sequel when the film was being made, but that it mostly died with the disappointing box office. Jackson said he was still interested in a sequel but Shyamalan was non-committal. In February 2010, Willis said that Shyamalan was "still thinking about doing the fight movie between me and Sam that we were going to do", and stated that as long as Jackson was able to participate he would be "up for it".

Split 

In September 2010, Shyamalan revealed that an additional villain had been omitted from Unbreakable in anticipation of their inclusion in a sequel, but that the character had instead been used for a forthcoming film he was writing for and producing.

Shyamalan's horror thriller film Split has been described as a thematic sequel to Unbreakable, and was released on January 20, 2017. Although it was filmed substantially as a standalone film, an uncredited cameo by Bruce Willis as David Dunn indeed establishes Split as a story within the same world.

Additionally, Shyamalan has stated the orange-suited villain portrayed by Chance Kelly in Unbreakable was initially going to be the character "The Horde". However, features of The Horde were dropped to make the character simpler in order to keep the focus on David. The original character, Kevin Wendell Crumb, would later be fully realized in Split.

Glass 

Shyamalan expressed hope for a third installment following Split, saying, "I hope [a third Unbreakable film happens]. The answer is yes. I'm just such a wimp sometimes. I don't know what's going to happen when I go off in my room, a week after this film opens, to write the script. But I'm going to start writing. [I have] a really robust outline, which is pretty intricate. But now the standards for my outlines are higher. I need to know I've won already. I'm almost there but I'm not quite there." In April 2017, Shyamalan announced the official title, release date, and returning actors for the third movie. The film, titled Glass, was released on January 18, 2019 and features Bruce Willis, Samuel L. Jackson, Anya Taylor-Joy, and James McAvoy returning to their respective roles in the series.

See also 
 List of films featuring home invasions
 List of sole survivors of aviation accidents and incidents

References

External links 

 
 

2000 films
2000s mystery films
2000 psychological thriller films
2000 science fiction films
2000s superhero films
American mystery films
American psychological thriller films
American science fiction films
American superhero films
Blinding Edge Pictures films
Films about disability
Films scored by James Newton Howard
Films directed by M. Night Shyamalan
Films produced by Barry Mendel
Films produced by M. Night Shyamalan
Films set in Philadelphia
Home invasions in film
Films about mass murder
Films with screenplays by M. Night Shyamalan
Osteogenesis imperfecta in films
Superhero drama films
Superhero thriller films
Touchstone Pictures films
Unbreakable (film series)
Films shot in Philadelphia
2000s English-language films
2000s American films